The 2019 Trophée des Champions was the 24th edition of the French super cup. The match was contested by the winners of the 2018–19 Ligue 1, Paris Saint-Germain and Coupe de France champions, Rennes. The match was played at the Shenzhen Universiade Sports Centre in Shenzhen, China.

Paris Saint-Germain were the six-time defending champions, having beat Monaco in the 2018 edition, and they won the match 2–1 for their seventh consecutive and ninth overall Trophée des Champions title.

Match

Details

See also
 2018–19 Ligue 1
 2018–19 Coupe de France

References

External links
  

2019
2019–20 in French football
2019 in Chinese football
International club association football competitions hosted by China
Paris Saint-Germain F.C. matches
Stade Rennais F.C. matches
Sport in Shenzhen
August 2019 sports events in China
Sports competitions in Guangdong